Natalie Marie Spooner  (born October 17, 1990) is a Canadian ice hockey player for the now defunct Toronto Furies, who played for the Canadian National women's ice hockey team from 2007 to 2008, and rejoined the program in 2010.

Spooner was the first player to play for the Canadian National Women's Team, the National Women's Under-22 Team and its Under-18 Team.

In 2014, Spooner became the first woman in hockey history to claim the gold medal in the Olympic Winter Games and the Clarkson Cup in the same year. Spooner is a fast and passionate hockey player who now has a High Performance Hockey Academy for girls.

Playing career

Hockey Canada
Spooner has represented Canada on its National and Under-22 squads. In 2008–09 and 2009–10, she played on the Under-22 team. She won gold at the 2010 MLP Cup and silver at the 2009 MLP Cup. She played on the Canadian National Women's Team at the 2008 Four Nations Cup.

From May 25–30, 2010, in Calgary, Spooner was invited to participate in the Canadian National Women's Program Strength and Conditioning Camp. Spooner also played for Team Canada at the Ball Hockey World Championship in Pilsen, Czech Republic, from June 13–20, 2009. Spooner won gold at the event. Spooner participated in the inaugural IIHF World Women's U-18 Championships in January 2008 and won the silver medal. In August 2007, the Canadian U-18 played a summer series against the U-18 Team USA squad, and Spooner was an assistant captain.

On November 10, 2010, Spooner scored a hat trick against Sweden in the 2010 Four Nations Cup. In the gold medal game of the 2011 Four Nations Cup, Spooner scored two goals in a 4–3 loss to the USA.

In a game versus Russia at the 2012 IIHF Women's World Championship, Spooner logged a hat trick in a 14–1 victory. In addition, Spooner registered an assist in a four-point performance. In the 2016 IIHF girls championship, Spooner got a hat trick VS. Finland.

Spooner and Team Canada won against team USA 4-2.

On January 11, 2022, Spooner was named to Canada's 2022 Olympic team.

Mississauga Chiefs
Spooner participated in the 2008 Esso Women's Nationals with the Mississauga Chiefs.

PWHL and Junior
While she attended Cedarbrae Collegiate Institute, Spooner played with the Durham West Jr. Lightning. At Cedarbrae, she was named the school's athlete of the year for four consecutive years. She captained the team to a fourth-place finish in the Provincial Women's Hockey League in 2008. During the 2007–08 season, Spooner led the Lightning in goals with 25 and was third on the team in scoring with 38 points in 23 games.  Her point total ranked 11th in the league. During the 2006–07 PWHL season, Spooner was the leading goal-scorer with 32 goals and served as an assistant captain. She was a member of Team Ontario Red with future Buckeye teammate Laura McIntosh. Spooner served as captain of the squad, leading it to the gold medal in the U-18 National Hockey Tournament after recovering from a broken jaw sustained in a PWHL game. She broke her jaw in two places, had her mouth wired shut for five weeks and was limited to a liquid diet. Before committing to Ohio State, approximately 30 universities and colleges expressed interest in her.

Ohio State
As a freshman, Spooner played in 30 games (she missed six games due to her commitments with Team Canada). Despite playing in only 30 games, Spooner scored 21 goals to lead the Buckeyes. She added nine assists for 30 points, which ranked third on the Buckeyes. Spooner set a Buckeye record by winning four WCHA Rookie of the Week awards. She has been one of the top goal-scorers in the WCHA during the 08-09 and 09-10 two seasons. Her 43 career goals rank sixth among the Buckeyes. Her 74 career points are 14th after 65 games played. Spooner was a First Team All-WCHA honoree during the 2009–10 season.
 On January 28–29, 2011, Spooner scored four goals and contributed six points as the Buckeyes swept conference rival St. Cloud State on the road. In Ohio State's 6–1 victory on January 28, Spooner recorded her third-career hat trick as well as an assist. Her goal at 9:58 of the second period came shorthanded and proved to be the game-winner. Spooner had two points in the second game as the Buckeyes prevailed by a 3–2 mark. Spooner leads the Buckeyes with 14 multi-point games this season and owns a team-high 24 goals. Spooner holds the Buckeye record for career game-winning goals with 12. In the Buckeyes final regular season game of the 2010–11 season, Spooner scored a goal (her 25th of the season) in a 5–1 loss to Minnesota-Duluth to tie Jana Harrigan for second on the all-time Ohio State career list with 68 goals

In the first conference game of the 2011–12 Ohio State Buckeyes women's ice hockey season against Bemidji State, Spooner had four goals in regulation, along with the only goal in the shootout to lead the Buckeyes to victory. On November 25, 2011, Spooner scored four goals for the third time in her NCAA career, including a natural hat trick as the Buckeyes enjoyed a home-ice conference victory over Minnesota Duluth. She scored all four goals as the final score was 4–1 in the Buckeyes favour. It was the second time in the 2011–12 campaign that she scored four goals in a game. The natural hat trick (three consecutive goals) was scored in the second period as the Buckeyes faced a 1–0 deficit against the Bulldogs. The eventual game-winner was scored at 10:56 of the second period. The hat trick was the fifth of her collegiate career. The four-goal performance moved Spooner to fourth overall on the Buckeye career points list with 129. Spooner is now four goals away from tying Jeni Creary's Ohio State record of 86 career goals.

Spooner had a record-breaking weekend in a weekend series versus St. Cloud State on January 6 and 7, 2012. She scored three goals and added one assist in a two-game set while becoming the Buckeyes' all-time leading goal scorer. Heading into the series, she was only three goals away from breaking the school record of 86 set by forward Jeni Creary. She tied the mark on January 6, 2012, as she scored both goals, including the game-winner. In addition, she was acknowledged as the First Star of the Game in a 2–0 win. The following day, she set the record at 5:27 of the third period versus St. Cloud State in a 4–3 loss. Spooner was named Third Star of the Game. After the game, Spooner had accumulated 140 career points (87 goals, 53 assists) to rank fourth in that category. She was now six points shy of breaking the Buckeyes' all-time scoring record.

In a January 27, 2012 defeat of the North Dakota Fighting Sioux, Natalie Spooner finished the game with two goals as the Buckeyes prevailed by a 6–2 mark.  Her two goals were both on the power play (increasing her season total to seven). Spooner reached the 150 career point plateau with the goals, moving her into third all-time in Ohio State history. On February 11, 2012, Spooner was one of five Buckeyes seniors honoured as part of a pre-game ceremony. The Buckeyes were defeated by No. 2 Minnesota by a 7–4 mark. Natalie Spooner had a hand in all four Buckeye goals, with two goals and two assists.

On March 19, 2012, Spooner was named to the CCM All-America Team. She earned second-team honours, and it marked the first Spooner was named an All-American. She became the fourth Buckeye (behind Tessa Bonhomme, Jana Harrigan, and Emma Laaksonen. She concluded her senior season with 50 points (team-best) on 31 goals and 19 assists. Her 25 goals scored in  WCHA conference action ranked second overall among all WCHA skaters. During the 2011–12 campaign, she had a team-best 16 multiple-point games while logging three hat tricks. In addition, Spooner notched nine multiple-goal games and four multiple-assist games this year.

Spooner concluded her career first overall in four program record lists. She owns the season goals record and the Ohio State career record in goals scored (broke record on January 7, 2012). At the end of her four seasons, she finished with 100. On October 14, 2011, Spooner broke the program record in career goals vs. WCHA opponents. For her career, she has had 75 goals versus WCHA opponents. Her 163 career points ranks second all-time among Buckeyes players, while her 16 game-winning goals are another program record.

CWHL

Selected by the Furies in the second round of the 2012 CWHL Draft, Spooner would set a franchise record for most goals by a rookie. She also finished second in team scoring, trailing scoring leader Rebecca Johnston.

Making her CWHL debut on October 20, 2012, in a road game at Brampton, Spooner scored a hat trick and assist, resulting in a four-point performance. As the Furies prevailed by a 4–3 count, Spooner factored into every one of the team's goals. Spooner's first point in the game was an assist to Mallory Deluce at the 7:18 mark of the first. Before the period would expire, Spooner scored an unassisted shorthanded goal for the first in her CWHL career. Spooner would score short-handed again in the second period, as Deluce reciprocated with an assist. Spooner would provide the overtime heroics, logging the game-winning goal at the 1:26 mark of the extra frame, as Deluce gained her second assist of the night. For her efforts, Spooner was recognized as the First Star of the Game.

Spooner would also register a pair of three-point performances in her rookie season with the Furies. Against Team Alberta, Spooner had a goal and an assist in a 5–0 shutout win. A 7–4 road win at Brampton on January 12, 2013, resulted in Spooner's other three-point performance.

Spooner was the Furies leading scorer during the 2014 Clarkson Cup playoffs. She would score the game-winning goal in a March 21, 2014 playoff match against the Montreal Stars, eliminating them from the postseason. In the championship game against the Boston Blades, Spooner would log an assist on the Cup-clinching goal.

Spooner would become the first player in Furies history to reach the plateau of 90 career points, achieving the feat during the 2016–17 CWHL season. In addition, she surpassed Kori Cheverie as the all-time leading scorer in Furies history. Spooner was one of two captains for Team Blue in the 3rd CWHL All-Star Game, the first time that one team in the CWHL All-Star Game had two captains.

Amazing Race Canada – Season 2
Along with Sochi teammate Meaghan Mikkelson, the pair were among the competing teams in the second season of The Amazing Race Canada. In the ice hockey skills challenge Detour "Puck It" combined with partner Meaghan Mikkelson to shoot 4 for 4 on the 1 through 4 "hole" targets, then 1 out of 53 attempts to hit the final five-hole target. She and Mikkelson would win seven legs of the race and end in second place on the final leg.

Personal life
Spooner's brother Rick played hockey for the Wisconsin Badgers and currently for Seattle ESB as the league's enforcer. A second brother, Doug, played for the Waterloo Warriors in Ontario.

In 2014, Spooner appeared as a contestant in the second season of The Amazing Race Canada with teammate Meaghan Mikkelson. They finished the race in 2nd place.

In 2019, Spooner paired with Andrew Poje in the fifth season of CBC's Battle of the Blades, where a hockey player and figure skater are paired up to compete for their chosen charity.

Career Statistics

Regular season and playoffs

International

Awards and honours
First Team All-WCHA (2009–10)
Played with the WCHA All-Star Team against the United States Women's National Team in St. Paul, Minn. (September 2009)
Ohio State's Most Valuable Offensive Player for 2009–10
Ohio State co-Most Valuable Offensive Player in 2008–09
WCHA All-Academic Team (2009–10)
Academic All-Big Ten at-large selection (2009–10) ...
Four WCHA Rookie of the Week awards (Oct. 24–25, Nov. 28–29, Dec. 12–13, Feb. 6–7)
WCHA Offensive Player of the Week (Jan. 15–16, 2010).
WCHA Offensive Player of the Week (Week of February 2, 2011)
2011 All-WCHA Second Team
2011 Big Ten Outstanding Sportsmanship Award
WCHA Co-Offensive Player of the Week (Week of October 12, 2011)
WCHA Offensive Player of the Week (Week of November 28, 2011)
WCHA Offensive Player of the Week (Week of January 11, 2012)
2011–12 CCM Hockey Women's Division I All-American: Second Team
2014 Clarkson Cup champion
Ohio State Buckeyes Hall of Fame (2019 inductee)

References

External links

1990 births
Canadian expatriate ice hockey players in the United States
Canadian women's ice hockey forwards
Clarkson Cup champions
Ice hockey players at the 2014 Winter Olympics
Ice hockey players at the 2018 Winter Olympics
Ice hockey players at the 2022 Winter Olympics
Living people
Medalists at the 2014 Winter Olympics
Medalists at the 2018 Winter Olympics
Medalists at the 2022 Winter Olympics
Mississauga Chiefs players
Ohio State Buckeyes women's ice hockey players
Olympic gold medalists for Canada
Olympic ice hockey players of Canada
Olympic medalists in ice hockey
Olympic silver medalists for Canada
Sportspeople from Scarborough, Toronto
Ice hockey people from Toronto
Toronto Furies players
Professional Women's Hockey Players Association players
The Amazing Race Canada contestants